James Edward Threapleton (born November 8, 1973, Wharfedale, West Riding of Yorkshire, England) is an English film director. Threapleton has worked as an assistant director on many films, including Hideous Kinky.

Career
His first work as a director (and writer) was the film Extraordinary Rendition, starring Omar Berdouni and Andy Serkis, which premiered at the 2007 Locarno Film Festival.

Personal life
The elder of two boys, he has a younger brother Robin. He and Kate Winslet, whom he met on the set of Hideous Kinky, married on 22 November 1998 in Reading, Berkshire, Winslet's hometown. They have a daughter, Mia Honey Threapleton (born 12 October 2000 in London). The couple separated in September 2001 and divorced on 13 December 2001.

In 2008 Threapleton married his second wife, Julie Vuorinen, a school administrator and teacher to special needs students. They have two daughters, Olivia, born in 2009, and Georgia, born in 2013.

References

External links
 

1973 births
English film directors
Living people
People from Craven District